Asipa is a town in Ife North Local Government area, Osun State, Nigeria. 
The present settlement known as Asipa was said to have derived its name from a corrupt pronunciation of the original meaning “Adipa”, as derived from “Adipa Ogun Olote” a name that was given to Fasina as a result of his role in helping the then Ooni defeat the Nupe raiders. 
In the widely accepted account by people of Asipa, it was said that Fasina was the founder of the town, an existence which could be dated back to Ooni Abeweila Adegunle (1839-1849). He was said to have migrated from Abeweila compound in Ife. As a hunter and warrior, he was said to have established a small camp in the present day Fasina in Ile Ife where he and his cohorts do find rest, eat and refresh themselves after their hunting journey. In this account, Fasina, a brave warrior and hunter was said to have helped in forestalling the successive invasion of Ife by Nupe raiders in which they refer to as the "Tapas". History recorded that Ooni Abeweila requested Fasina to go fight them. His success was rewarded with a large portion of land, later known as the present day Asipa. 
This tradition argues that as a result of the blood relationship Fasina shares with Abeweila compound in Ife, the Abeweila compound has a long-standing relationship with the people of Asipa even till recent times. 
As a result of his bravery and fame among other warriors, the then Aare of Ibadan (Akintoye) invited Fasina to come and help join his warriors to fight a battle against his enemies who waged war at Ibadan. Fasina successfully assisted Akintoye, and they overcome the enemies. On his journey home, Aare Akintoye bestowed him with several gifts inclusive of slaves. He stopped for a rest overnight at a place known as Ikire, where the Akire of Ikire gave him a wife, his daughter, princess Oduola, famously known as “Oduola o’lobo iyun, afi gbogbo omo bi loba loba” – meaning Oduola the woman with a beaded private part, whose sons all became kings”.    
One thing worthy of note is that this account recognizes Fasina as the founder and the first ruler of the town. 
More so, this account agree that Fasina first settled in the present day Fasina, now in Ife. 
And finally, this account support the narration that Ooni Adegunle Abeweila gave the present day Asipa to Fasina in reward of his bravery.
The reigning monarch of Asipa Land is His Royal Majesty Oba Mufutau Babawale Oyehan Oyekanmi, Ilufemiloye Fasina VIII, Alasipa of Asipa from Fasina ruling house. He was born to late Chief Akintoye Shittu Oyekanmi and Princess Alice Oyeronke Oyekanmi. He became the Alasipa on 25 November 2018.
May God enlarge our coat in Asipa town.

References

1. Interview with His Royal Majesty Oba Mufutau Babawale Oyehan Oyekanmi, Ilufemiloye Fasina VIII, Alasipa of Asipa on 4 April 2019.

2. Akinrinade O T, ‘Analysis of the legends of Origbo towns’ Journal of the History Student Society University of Ife, Vol 9, 1982.

3. Interview with Chief (Mrs.) Alimotu Ogunremi Nee Akintoye, Ekaarun Balogun Obinrin, on 24 February 2018.

Populated places in Osun State